Erik Moberg (born 5 July 1986) is a Swedish former footballer who played as a defender.

References

External links
 
 Eliteprospects profile
 

1986 births
Living people
Association football defenders
Åtvidabergs FF players
Örebro SK players
Jönköpings Södra IF players
Viborg FF players
Allsvenskan players
Superettan players
Swedish footballers
People from Motala Municipality
Footballers from Östergötland County